Faron Medhi (born January 26, 2004) is an American model and beauty pageant titleholder who was crowned Miss Teen USA 2022 on. She is the first Teen from Nebraska to win Miss Teen USA.

Early life and education
Medhi was born and raised in Omaha, Nebraska to an Indian father and an American mother.

Pageantry

Miss Nebraska Teen USA 2022
Competed as Miss Omaha Teen USA, Medhi won Miss Nebraska Teen USA in 2022 and was crowned by outgoing titleholder Daisy Sudderth, becoming the first Asian-American Miss Nebraska Teen USA on March 6, 2022, in Omaha, Nebraska.

Miss Teen USA 2022
After winning Miss Nebraska Teen USA, she represented Nebraska at Miss Teen USA 2022. At the end of the event, she was crowned as Miss Teen USA 2022 by her outgoing titleholder, Miss Teen USA 2021, Breanna Myles (Miss Florida Teen USA), becoming the first titleholder of Indian descent.

References

Living people
American beauty pageant winners
American people of Indian descent
Miss Teen USA winners
People from Omaha, Nebraska
2004 births